John Logan Black (July 12, 1830 - March 25, 1902) was a Confederate States Army officer, a Lieutenant Colonel in the cavalry who served at the Battle of Gettysburg.

He was born in York, South Carolina.  He is buried in Aimwell Cemetery in Ridgeway, South Carolina.

References

1830 births
1902 deaths
Confederate States Army officers
People from York, South Carolina
United States Military Academy alumni